Heinke van der Merwe (born 3 May 1985 in Johannesburg, South Africa) is a professional South African rugby union player. His first tour with the Springboks was to France, Italy, Ireland & England in late 2009 where he played in one test and two touring matches.

In June 2010, van der Merwe joined Leinster on a 2-year contract, replacing CJ van der Linde at the province.

In November 2012, van der Merwe was called up to the South African squad for their European tour, due to injury cover.

He joined Stade Francais for the 2013/14 season.

Honours
Test debut: 24 November 2007 vs  in Cardiff aged 22
Last test: 18 July 2015 vs  in Brisbane aged 30
Total tests: 5
Tour matches: 3
Total Springbok matches: 4
Win ratio: 4–1–0
Tours:
Wales & England, 2007
France, Italy, Ireland & England, 2009
Ireland, Scotland & England, 2012
Rugby Championship 2015
SA Under-19 Player of the Season, 2004
Heineken Cup with Leinster - 2011, 2012
Pro 12 League winner with Leinster - 2013
French Top 14 winner with Stade Français - 2015

References

External links 

Lions Profile

1985 births
Alumni of Monument High School
Living people
South African rugby union players
South Africa international rugby union players
Rugby union props
Golden Lions players
Lions (United Rugby Championship) players
Sharks (rugby union) players
Rugby union players from Johannesburg
Leinster Rugby players
White South African people